Ralph Gary "Rocky" Thompson (born November 8, 1947) is a former American football player for the New York Giants in the National Football League.

Thompson, a running back/wide receiver, played college football at Hartnell College and West Texas State, where he was the roommate of future Dallas Cowboys star Duane Thomas.  Thompson was a world-class sprinter who won the AAA Championships 100 metres in 1970 with a time of 10.1 seconds, and representing Bermuda, he reached the final of the 100 metres at the 1970 British Commonwealth Games, finishing sixth.

The Giants drafted Thompson in the first round of the 1971 NFL Draft with the 18th overall selection.  He appeared in all 28 regular-season games for the Giants in 1971 and 1972, primarily as a kickoff returner, but his NFL career was ended by a severe neck injury during play. The Giants subsequently released Thompson before the start of the 1974 season.

Shortly after Thompson was selected in the first round of the 1971 draft out of West Texas State, The New York Times reported that Rocky Thompson is listed in Bermuda and in official Brit track records as Ralph Gary Symonds.  Thompson explained that his mother's maiden name was Symonds but when she remarried he took his stepfather's name of "Thompson."  But he competed at track under his mother's maiden name, and later as Rocky Thompson-Symonds, since his mother had also ran track for Bermuda.

References

Living people
1947 births
People from Paget Parish
American football running backs
American football wide receivers
Bermudian players of American football
Bermudian male sprinters
West Texas A&M Buffaloes football players
New York Giants players
Commonwealth Games competitors for Bermuda
Athletes (track and field) at the 1970 British Commonwealth Games
Junior college men's track and field athletes in the United States
Bermudian expatriate sportspeople in the United States
Track and field athletes in the National Football League